Quaker School is a historic Quaker school at York and Penn Streets in Burlington, Burlington County, New Jersey, United States.

It was built in 1792 and added to the National Register of Historic Places in 1974.

See also
 High Street Historic District.
 Burlington Historic District.
 List of the oldest buildings in New Jersey
 National Register of Historic Places listings in Burlington County, New Jersey
 Burlington Towne Centre (River Line station)

References

School buildings on the National Register of Historic Places in New Jersey
School buildings completed in 1792
Buildings and structures in Burlington County, New Jersey
Burlington, New Jersey
Quaker schools in New Jersey
National Register of Historic Places in Burlington County, New Jersey
1792 establishments in New Jersey